German submarine U-1227 was a Type IXC/40 U-boat of Nazi Germany's Kriegsmarine during World War II.

The submarine was laid down on 1 February 1943 at the Deutsche Werft yard at Hamburg, launched on 18 September 1943, and commissioned on 8 December 1943 under the command of Oberleutnant zur See Friedrich Altmeier. The U-boat then served with 31st U-boat Flotilla, a training unit, with 2nd U-boat Flotilla from 1 August until 31 December 1944, and with 33rd U-boat Flotilla from 1 January until 10 April 1945.

Design
German Type IXC/40 submarines were slightly larger than the original Type IXCs. U-1227 had a displacement of  when at the surface and  while submerged. She had two shafts and two  propellers.

U-1227 was fitted with six  torpedo tubes (four fitted at the bow and two at the stern), 22 torpedoes, one  SK C/32 naval gun, 180 rounds, and a  Flak M42 as well as two twin  C/30 anti-aircraft guns. The boat had a complement of forty-eight.

Service history
U-1227 completed only one combat patrol, from 14 September until 26 December 1944. On 4 October 1944 she attempted to attack a convoy at night, but was seen in the bright moonlight and counter-attacked by convoy escorts. She torpedoed one of the escorts, the Canadian  , during the pursuit. The frigate was a total loss, but the U-boat escaped and continued its patrol.

Fate
U-1227 was damaged at Kiel in a British night-bombing raid on 9 April 1945, and was decommissioned there on 10 April. U-1227 was scuttled to avoid capture on 3 May 1945.

Summary of raiding history

References

Notes

Citations

Bibliography

External links

Ships built in Hamburg
German Type IX submarines
U-boats commissioned in 1943
World War II submarines of Germany
1943 ships
Operation Regenbogen (U-boat)
Maritime incidents in May 1945